Mount Thompson is a 13,494-foot-elevation (4,113 meter) mountain summit located on the crest of the Sierra Nevada mountain range in California, United States. It is situated on the shared boundary of Kings Canyon National Park with John Muir Wilderness, and along the common border of Fresno County with Inyo County. 
Mount Thompson ranks as the 62nd-highest summit in California. This mountain's name commemorates Almon Harris Thompson (1839–1906). The first ascent of the peak was made by Clarence H. Rhudy and H. F. Katzenbach in the summer of 1909.

Climbing
Established climbing routes on Mount Thompson:

 Northwest Face –  – First Ascent June 30, 1931, by Norman Clyde
 Southwest Face  – class 2 – FA August 14, 1939, by Jack Sturgeon
 Thompson Ridge – class 3 – FA 1959
 Knudtson Couloir – class AI3 – FA 1984
 Moynier Couloir – class 5.6 – FA 1986
 Smrz Couloir – class 5.6 – FA 1990
 Harrington Couloir – class AI2
 Southeast Face  – class 3–4
 West Ridge  – class 3

Climate
According to the Köppen climate classification system, Mount Thompson is located in an alpine climate zone. Most weather fronts originate in the Pacific Ocean, and travel east toward the Sierra Nevada mountains. As fronts approach, they are forced upward by the peaks, causing them to drop their moisture in the form of rain or snowfall onto the range (orographic lift). Precipitation runoff from this mountain drains south into the Middle Fork Kings River, and north into Bishop Creek.

See also
 List of the major 4000-meter summits of California
 Mount Goode

Gallery

References

External links

 Weather forecast: Mount Thompson

Inyo National Forest
Mountains of Inyo County, California
Mountains of Fresno County, California
Mountains of Kings Canyon National Park
Mountains of the John Muir Wilderness
North American 4000 m summits
Mountains of Northern California
Sierra Nevada (United States)